A Hanging (1931) is a short essay written by George Orwell, first published in August 1931 in the British literary magazine The Adelphi. Set in Burma, where Orwell (under his real name of Eric Arthur Blair) had served in the British Imperial Police from 1922 to 1927, it describes the execution of a criminal.

The Story
The condemned man is given no name, nor is it explained what crime he has committed. For the British police who supervise his execution, the hanging is an unpleasant but routine piece of business. The narrator takes no active part in the hanging, and appears to be less experienced than his colleagues. As the prisoner is marched and handcuffed to the gallows he steps slightly aside to avoid treading in a puddle of rainwater; the narrator sees this, and reflects:

The sentence is carried out, and all concerned feel a sudden relief as they leave the scene where the dead man still hangs.

Context
Britain conquered Burma over 62 years (1824–86), during which three Anglo-Burmese Wars were fought, and incorporated it into its Indian Empire. Britain administered Burma as an Indian province until 1937, when it became a separate, self-governing colony. Burma attained independence in 1948.

Veracity
When asked about A Hanging, Orwell was unwilling to discuss the subject, and once said that it was "only a story." No known evidence shows specifically where and when he witnessed an execution during his time in Burma. In his writings, however, he repeated that he had done so. He further reflected upon hanging in his As I Please column for Tribune, 15 November 1946. According to Dennis Collings, a friend of Orwell from 1921, when his father became the Blair (Orwell) family doctor, it was certain Orwell would have witnessed a hanging, and that policemen had to see a hanging, 'as a kind of initiation. There had to be police officers present at executions—and cadets were assigned to that kind of thing.'

See also
Bibliography of George Orwell

References

External links
A Hanging
"Orwell's Burma", an essay in Time

Essays by George Orwell
1931 essays
Works originally published in The Adelphi